Bellevue railway station (also known as Bellevue Junction) was a junction station on the Eastern Railway in the Perth suburb of Bellevue.

History
On 11 March 1884, the Eastern Railway first route opened from Guildford to Chidlow via Greenmount and Sawyers Valley. Bellevue did not initially have a station. On 1 July 1896, the second route opened, deviating from the first route at Bellevue, going via Swan View and Parkerville to rejoin the original line at Mount Helena. The first route remained open.

Bellevue station was built in the late 1890s on the site of 24 Mile Siding, 2.1 kilometres east of Midland Junction with an island platform.

On 2 July 1900, a 400-metre line from Bellevue to Helena Vale Racecourse opened. This closed on 17 April 1963.

The 17 kilometre section of the first route between Mountain Quarry and Mount Helena closed on 24 January 1954, with the final 4.3 kilometre section from Mountain Quarry closed on 31 December 1965. The second route closed on 13 February 1966 to be replaced by the standard gauge third route.

Bellevue was for considerable periods of its history the terminus of metropolitan passenger services from Perth. Exceptions after the closing of the Mundaring Branch Railway in 1954, were when the Koongamia station construction saw re-use of the defunct Mundaring Branch Railway between 1960 and 1962. It was also served by long-distance trains to Chidlow and Northam.

Operations in the vicinity of the western part of the Bellevue railway station were considered to be part of the Midland Junction marshalling area in later years of operation. Services to Bellevue station were withdrawn on 31 December 1965 and the station closed.

Proposed new station
As part of the Metronet project, it is proposed to extend Transperth's Midland line services to Bellevue which will require a new station to be built.

Notes

References

 
 
 Watson, Lindsay.Midland Junction Railway Station  Western Rails, Vol 9, no.4 (July 1987), p. 10-11

Shire of Mundaring
Disused railway stations in Western Australia
Eastern Railway (Western Australia)
Rail junctions in Western Australia
Railway stations closed in 1965
Railway stations opened in 1897